Brailsford is an English surname. Notable people with the surname include:

Dave Brailsford (born 1963), Welsh bicycle racer turned coach
H. N. Brailsford (1873–1958), British political journalist
James Frederick Brailsford (1888–1961), English physician
Jane Esdon Brailsford (1874–1937), Scottish suffragette
Jim Brailsford (born 1933), British cricket player
John Brailsford the elder (fl. 1712–1739) English cleric and poet 
John Brailsford the younger (died 1775), English cleric, headmaster and author 
Kenneth E. Brailsford (contemporary), American entrepreneur, investor and philanthropist 
Matthew Brailsford (1660-1733), Dean of Wells 
Neil Brailsford, Lord Brailsford (born 1954), Scottish Senator of the College of Justice and Supreme Court Judge
Pauline Brailsford (born 1928), English actor
Sally Brailsford (born 1951), British professor of management science
Simon Brailsford (contemporary), British RAF officer; equerry to the Queen 1998–2001
Tim Brailsford (contemporary), Vice Chancellor and President of Bond University 

English-language surnames